Chains Changed is an EP recording by Throwing Muses, released in 1987 (see 1987 in music).

Track listing
All songs written by Kristin Hersh except where noted

"Finished" - 3:51
"Reel" - 2:47 (Tanya Donelly)
"Snail Head" - 2:38
"Cry Baby Cry" - 4:24

Personnel
Kristin Hersh - vocals and guitars
Tanya Donelly - vocals and guitars
Leslie Langston - bass
David Narcizo - drums and percussion

Production
Producer: Gil Norton

Throwing Muses albums
1987 EPs
4AD EPs
Albums produced by Gil Norton